The Kenya cricket team toured Canada in 2009. They played three One Day Internationals and an Intercontinental Cup match against Canada.

Intercontinental Cup Match

ODI series

1st ODI

2nd ODI

3rd ODI

External links
 Series homepage on ESPNcricinfo

International cricket competitions in 2009
2009 in cricket
2009 in Canadian sports
Kenyan cricket tours abroad
International cricket tours of North America
Canada–Kenya relations